The 2010 Arkansas Razorbacks football team represented the University of Arkansas in the 2010 NCAA Division I FBS football season. The team played five home games at Razorback Stadium and two home games at War Memorial Stadium. Coach Bobby Petrino was in his third year with the Razorbacks. They were members of the Western Division of the Southeastern Conference.  The Razorbacks finished the season 10–2, 6–2 in SEC play and earned a berth in the Sugar Bowl, their first major bowl appearance since playing in the 1990 Cotton Bowl Classic, where they were defeated by Ohio State by a 31–26 score.

Before the season

Players
Quarterback Ryan Mallett had successful offseason surgery on a broken left foot. The injury occurred during a conditioning drill, and will keep the Texarkana native out of spring drills. Sophomore defensive backs David Gordon and Hunter Miller were arrested on April 26 for possession of drugs. Offensive tackle DeMarcus Love was named to the Outland Trophy watchlist, and Ryan Mallett was named the frontrunner for the Davey O'Brien Award by The Sporting News. Mallett and tight end D. J. Williams also have been named to numerous preseason All-American teams. Earning All-SEC honors include Joe Adams, Greg Childs, Wade Grayson, DeMarcus Love, Jerry Franklin, Jake Bequette, DeQuinta Jones, and Jerico Nelson. Coach Bobby Petrino, Mallett, Williams, and back-up quarterback Tyler Wilson all appeared on ESPN's College Football Live. Wide receiver Carlton Salters left the football team on July 12 in order to pursue his professional baseball career.

Recruits

Schedule

‡ New Donald W. Reynolds Razorback Stadium Attendance Record
NOTE:  Ohio State's Sugar Bowl win was vacated after Ohio State's 2010 season was vacated, due to several violations of NCAA rules and regulations by numerous Buckeye players, and OSU head coach Jim Tressel's lack of institutional control. Arkansas' loss in the Sugar Bowl remains a loss in the records.

Personnel

Coaching staff

Roster

Statistics

Team

Scores by quarter

Offense

Rushing

Passing

Receiving

Defense

Special teams

Rankings

Game summaries

Tennessee Tech

Arkansas met Tennessee Tech for the first time on the gridiron to open the 2010 season of lofty expectations. The Hogs started slowly, with TTU taking a 3–0 lead into the second quarter, but Arkansas was driving to close the first quarter, and running back Dennis Johnson scored from seven yards out for the Hogs' first touchdown of the season. The Arkansas defense recorded a safety on the ensuing TTU possession. Arkansas running back Broderick Green leaped in for another Razorbacks score, making the lead 16–3 for Arkansas. The Razorbacks added an 85-yard scoring pass from quarterback Ryan Mallett to Joe Adams before halftime.
The Hogs came out strong in the second half, with Ronnie Wingo scoring another Razorbacks touchdown on the ground. Mallett began to click with his receivers at this point, finding Cobi Hamilton and Joe Adams for passing touchdowns. Arkansas did not punt in the contest, and won easily 44–3. This was the first time under Bobby Petrino that the Hogs kept an opponent without a touchdown.

Louisiana–Monroe

Ryan Mallett threw for four hundred yards for the third time in his career, and Greg Childs had twelve catches as Arkansas' offense rallied in the second half to finish the Warhawks. The Razorbacks offense looked lethargic in the first half, but the Arkansas defense was stout. The first score of the game came in the first quarter, Greg Childs hauling in a 19-yard touchdown pass From Ryan Mallett. Neither team scored again until the third quarter, when Mallett took a quarterback sneak one yard to paydirt. Rudell Crim of Arkansas intercepted a pass, and the Hogs drove for five minutes resulting Zach Hocker's first career field goal as a Razorback. Childs again caught a Mallett touchdown pass, diving into the end zone to make the score 24–0. At this point, Louisiana-Monroe strung a drive together and connected on a Luther Ambrose 25 yard touchdown reception from Kolton Browning. Razorback sophomore Ronnie Wingo scored on a screen pass to stretch the final margin to 31–7. Arkansas' offense had three turnovers in the contest, but the defense played well; limiting ULM to under 200 yards of total offense.

Georgia

The Razorbacks began the SEC season by meeting Georgia in Athens, Georgia. The Hogs looked to answer critics that believe the Razorbacks cannot win an SEC game on the road. Georgia was victorious in Razorback Stadium in 2009 shootout. The Hogs had to play without the services of top running back Dennis Johnson, who suffered a season-ending injury the week previous. The Bulldogs were playing without impact receiver A. J. Green, who was suspended for selling his jersey to an agent.

The Hogs scored first only minutes into the game on a Mallett pass to Chris Gragg for a 57-yard score. Georgia freshman QB Aaron Murray scored on the ground to even the score. The Hogs responded with a Knile Davis rushing score, and a Zach Hocker field goal to take a 17–7 lead into half. After the break, Georgia kicker Blair Walsh recorded a field goal, but Mallett found Ronnie Wingo to reply. Behind by fourteen points, Georgia stormed back with Tavarres King and Washaun Ealey both scoring touchdowns to knot the game in the fourth quarter. Georgia had a chance to win the game, but a sack by Jake Bequette that tore Murry's helmet off ended the drive and forced UGA to punt. Given a chance to win the game, Mallett completed two passes to D. J. Williams to move the Hogs to the UGA 40. Childs caught a perfect pass from Mallett along the left side, and after breaking a tackle, dashed 40 yards for the game-winning score with fifteen seconds remaining. Mallett was 3 of 3 for 73 yards on the final game-winning drive, confirming his status as a Heisman Trophy contender.

Alabama

Texas A&M, Southwest Classic

The Arkansas offense exploded in the first half by racking up 317 yards in the second annual Southwest Classic. The Hogs were hurt on the scoreboard by penalties and missed kicks, however. Arkansas marched the ball down the field on the opening possession, running well and capping the drive with a Joe Adams touchdown reception. The Hogs defense forced a punt on the following Aggie drive, but Ryan Mallett threw a long interception on the Razorbacks' first play. Texas A&M returned the interception to the 2-yard line, but couldn't score until fourth down. The ensuing Razorbacks possession ended when Mallett threw a 71-yard touchdown pass to Cobi Hamilton, following a very successful play action fake. Arkansas had the potential for six more points, but a Zach Hocker miss and a botched fake attempts cost the Razorbacks more points. Mallett led a 63-second drive before halftime which ended in a Ben Cleveland touchdown reception, but Texas A&M responded with a quick score to make it a 21–14 lead for the Hogs at half.

The game became a defensive affair in the second half. Arkansas sealed the game in the fourth quarter with two run-heavy possessions that ate the clock. Texas A&M had a chance to tie the game with little time left, but failed and instead turned the ball over for the fourth time. The win gave the Hogs a 2–0 edge in Southwest Classic games.

Auburn

Arkansas traveled to Auburn, Alabama for an SEC shootout between Ryan Mallett and Auburn's Cameron Newton. Entering the game, Arkansas and Auburn were the SEC's top two offenses, respectively, with the Razorbacks also ranking third nationally in passing offense. The game provided plenty of points as promised, but changed complexion dramatically when Mallett left the game with a concussion in the second quarter. Razorbacks junior Tyler Wilson came in and threw for over 300 yards and 4 touchdowns, but also throw two costly interceptions late.

The game was also marred by many questionable calls by officials that hindered Arkansas. The primary calls were Mario Fannin's fumble prior crossing the goal line and a fumble by Broderick Green despite being down. A statement by Arkansas' athletic director Jeff Long indicates that the University has "registered our concerns regarding several officiating calls and review decisions made by replay officials".

Arkansas began the scoring on a Mallett pass to Van Stumon, who caught just his second career pass for a seven-yard score. After Auburn responded, Arkansas engineered a twelve play drive that ended with a Broderick Green TD run. On the ensuing Auburn possession, Mario Fannin fumbled the football prior to crossing the plane of the goal line. The call was reviewed but upheld as a touchdown. This was the first of many questionable calls to hurt Arkansas. This call was later explained by the SEC offices that an on-field official had signaled touchdown, despite indisputable video evidence that no official ever indicated touchdown. Auburn also blocked a punt. Tyler Wilson relieved an injured Mallett in the second quarter, throwing a touchdown pass to Greg Childs on his second drive. This made the score 21–27 in favor of Auburn at the half.

Wilson hit Childs for another TD in the second half, but Auburn returned the subsequent kickoff 99 yards to negate the score. Wilson replied with by completing a long flea flicker pass to Childs, followed by two passes to Joe Adams to hit paydirt. Wilson and the Razorbacks drove again, scoring on another Childs touchdown reception and two-point conversion reception. This scoring frenzy gave Arkansas a 43–37 lead. Auburn responded with a passing TD, and controversy ensued on Arkansas' next possession. Running back Broderick Green fumbled the football after being tackled. After a long review period, the play was not overturned and Auburn took possession. This call was heavily questioned by Bobby Petrino and the Razorback coaching staff. Auburn continued to a 65–43 victory.

A positive for the Razorbacks was receiver Greg Childs, who caught nine passes for 164 yards and two touchdowns.

Ole Miss

Vanderbilt

South Carolina

UTEP

Mississippi State

LSU, Battle for the Golden Boot

Arkansas met LSU in Little Rock, and the Hogs earned a season-defining 31–23 victory. Arkansas' second-ranked offense met the Tigers' top-ranked defense, but the Hogs recorded 464 yards of total offense against the Tigers. Arkansas's sophomore running back Knile Davis rushed for 152 yards, including nine straight rushes on the final Arkansas drive, and Ryan Mallett broke the school record with 60 touchdown passes in the contest. Cobi Hamilton of Arkansas had three catches for 164 yards and two touchdowns of 80+ yards, including a long score with six seconds remaining before halftime. Stevan Ridley had two rushing scores for LSU, and Jordan Jefferson completed 16 of 27 passes for 184 yards. Arkansas and LSU both closed the regular season at 10–2, with Arkansas finishing second in the SEC West behind Auburn. This was the team's last win over LSU until the 2014 season.

On December 5, the Razorbacks were invited to the 2011 Sugar Bowl. This was Arkansas' first ever BCS berth.

2011 Sugar Bowl – Ohio State

The Ohio State Buckeyes headed to the Superdome to take on the Arkansas Razorbacks. The Buckeyes came into the game 0–9 against the SEC in bowl games. The Buckeyes struck first, with Dane Sanzenbacher recovering a fumble in the end zone after Terrelle Pryor fumbled on the 3 yard line. Arkansas struck back with Ryan Mallett connecting with Joe Adams on a 17-yard pass. Dan Herron added a 9-yard run, and Sanzenbacher and DeVier Posey caught touchdown passes of 15 and 43 yards respectively to give the Buckeyes a big lead. Zach Hocker hit a 20-yard field goal as time expired and the Razorbacks were down 28–10 at the half.

In the third quarter, the momentum shifted Arkansas' direction. Hocker and Devin Barclay traded field goals, then Mallett connected with Jarius Wright for a touchdown, then made the two-point conversion on a pass to D. J. Williams to pull within ten. The Razorbacks closed the gap further in the fourth, on a safety by Jake Bequette and another field goal by Hocker. With just over a minute left, Arkansas blocked Ohio State's punt and recovered on the 18 yard line. However, Mallett's second pass attempt was intercepted and the Buckeyes ran out the clock and won, 31–26. Initially Ohio State's first bowl win over an SEC opponent, Ohio State's win was subsequently vacated when Ohio State later vacated their entire 2010 football season because of NCAA violations involving improper benefits to some of their players.

References

Arkansas
Arkansas Razorbacks football seasons
Arkansas Razorbacks football